The Third Saudi state is the heir to the two earlier Saudi states: the first and the second, founded by Abdul Aziz ibn Saud, who managed to capture the city of Riyadh on January 13, 1902. A long series of conflicts and conquests ultimately led to the establishment of the modern and contemporary Saudi state, the Kingdom of Saudi Arabia.

The third Saudi state was known at the beginning of its reign as "the Emirate of Riyadh" (1902-1913) and "the Emirate of Nejd and Hasa" (1913-1921). After the overthrow of the rival Emirate of Ha'il gave the Emirate of Najd and Al-Ahsa control of the entire Nejd region, it became known as the Sultanate of Nejd. Abdul Aziz conquered the Kingdom of Hejaz in 1925. He raised Nejd to a kingdom in 1927, and his dominions became known as the Kingdom of Hejaz and Nejd and its annexes. Abdul Aziz administered the two portions of his dual kingdom separately until the annexation of the Southern Territory and the announcement of the establishment of the Kingdom of Saudi Arabia in 1932.

See also
 History of Saudi Arabia
 Unification of Saudi Arabia
 Emirate of Diriyah
 Emirate of Nejd
 Emirate of Nejd and Hasa
 Emirate of Jabal Shammar
 Sultanate of Nejd
 Kingdom of Hejaz
 Kingdom of Hejaz and Nejd

References

External links

History of Saudi Arabia